Andrew Ray-Jamie Murphy (born 18 December 1969 in Melbourne, Victoria) is an Australian former triple jumper, best known for his bronze medal at the 2001 World Indoor Championships where he achieved an Oceanian indoor record of 17.20 metres.

His personal best is 17.32 metres, achieved at the 1999 World Championships in Seville. This ranks him second among Australian triple jumpers, only behind Ken Lorraway. 

His coach was Keith Connor. He is married to Elizabeth Lindwall (Murphy) and they have five children - Connor, Finn, Indiana, Takoda and Siena.

He currently works at Trinity Grammar School, Summer Hill as the Director of Track and Field where he has achieved many athletes winning national medals, including his oldest son, Connor.

Murphy coaches Rohan Browning, the first Australian in 17 years to compete in an Olympic men's 100 meters semi final. At the 2020 Olympics in Tokyo, Browning ran the 2nd fastest 100 meters ever by an Australian.
Rohan also obtained a very high ATAR of 99+ at Trinity Grammar, and is considered an all-rounder student.

International competitions

MIC of Track and Field at Trinity Grammar School

References

External links

1969 births
Living people
Athletes from Melbourne
Sportsmen from Victoria (Australia)
Australian male triple jumpers
Olympic athletes of Australia
Athletes (track and field) at the 1996 Summer Olympics
Athletes (track and field) at the 2000 Summer Olympics
Athletes (track and field) at the 2004 Summer Olympics
Commonwealth Games competitors for Australia
Athletes (track and field) at the 1990 Commonwealth Games
Athletes (track and field) at the 1994 Commonwealth Games
Athletes (track and field) at the 2006 Commonwealth Games